Sarah Chang (born Young Joo Chang; December 10, 1980) is a Korean American classical violinist. Recognized as a child prodigy, she first played as a soloist with  the New York Philharmonic and the Philadelphia Orchestra in 1989. She enrolled at Juilliard School to study music, graduated in 1999, and continued university studies. Especially during the 1990s and early to mid-2000s, Chang had major roles as a soloist with many of the world's major orchestras.

Early life and education
Chang was born in Philadelphia, Pennsylvania, and raised in Cherry Hill and Voorhees Township, New Jersey. She is the daughter of Myoung-Jun (her mother), a composer, and Min-Soo Chang (her father), who was a violinist and music teacher.  Chang's parents moved to the United States from South Korea in 1979 for her father's advanced music degree at Temple University. Her mother took composition classes at the University of Pennsylvania. Chang has said that although she "never actually lived in Korea... I do still feel very strongly it's where my roots are." Her younger brother Michael (born 1987) has a degree from Princeton University.

In 1986, when Chang was 5 years old, she auditioned for and was accepted to the Juilliard School by performing the Bruch Violin Concerto No. 1 in G minor. Chang spent her weekends attending music classes at Juilliard and shopping in New York City with her parents. When Chang was 6 years old, she started studying with Isaac Stern outside school. In 1989, she began working with Dorothy DeLay at her studio in New York where her father had received his musical lessons, and at the Aspen Music Festival and School. A former student and assistant to DeLay, Hyo Kang, also provided training to Chang.

Following her 1999 high school graduation in New Jersey, she returned to Juilliard for university and studied with DeLay.

Chang learned from a family environment to naturally speak Korean.

Due to her musical accomplishments, Chang is among a very small number of professional figures recognized as a child prodigy.

Career

Early work
Her mother trained her to play one-finger melodies on the piano at age 3. For her fourth birthday, she was given a 1/16-sized violin. Upon hearing her play at a dinner party, Philadelphia Orchestra concertmaster Norman Carol asked music director Riccardo Muti to listen to her. At age 8, she auditioned alongside Muti and Zubin Mehta, who was the music director of the New York Philharmonic.  Both granted her immediate engagements.

In 1991, when Chang was 10 years old, she recorded her first album, Debut; it was released by EMI Classics on August 18, 1992 and quickly reached the Billboard chart of classical best-sellers. Chang quickly rose to fame and became known on an international scale, performing up to 150 concerts a year. In 2006, Newsweek ranked her as one of the Top Eight Achieving Females in the United States. In the interview accompanying the feature, she commented: "I think having a career at such an early age kept me focused. We schedule at least two to three years in advance in the classical industry. I felt so grounded and so grateful to already know what it was that I wanted to do with my life."

2002–2005

In 2002, she performed in Pyongyang, North Korea. Chang commented: "The concert was full of government officials. Every single last seat. It was invitation only, but it was an unbelievable experience. Frightening and exhilarating at the same time. And I just thought about how lucky I am. I am so fortunate to be a musician, and at that moment, I genuinely felt that music is the one and only universal language."

Chang took part in watchmaker Movado's global advertising campaign "The Art of Time" with Pete Sampras and composer Wynton Marsalis.  For the 2004 Olympics, she was selected to carry the Olympic Torch in New York. In 2005, Yale University dedicated a chair in Sprague Hall in Chang's name. Following this, Chang toured for a year with the Berlin Philharmonic and the Royal Concertgebouw Orchestra in a Sextet programme of summer festivals leading to a concert at the Berlin Philharmonie.

2007–present
Chang played a recital at Carnegie Hall on April 7, 2007, accompanied by the British pianist Ashley Wass. She has continued to perform with the Los Angeles Philharmonic and Esa-Pekka Salonen and make appearances with the former at both the Hollywood Bowl and Walt Disney Concert Hall throughout 2008.  On March 27 and 28 2008 she played for San Antonio, Texas audiences at the Majestic Theater, a performance which was preceded by an appearance (to meet and inspire young as well as seasoned musicians at no charge) at Antonio Strad Violin in the same city.  From May 2009 to June 2010, she held recital tours across Europe, North America and Asia with pianist Andrew von Oeyen; a July 2010 recording of the two was eventually released. In the February 12, 2010 program, she held her recital at the Barbican Hall in London. Chang made an appearance at the University of Southern California in March 2010, where she played Max Bruch's Violin Concerto No. 1 in G minor, Op. 26. She performed at the Hollywood Bowl in August 2010.

Instruments 
Sarah Chang owns several violins, and her main violin is the 1717 Guarneri del Gesu by the Cremonese luthier, Giuseppe Guarneri del Gesù which she inherited from her mentor, Isaac Stern. In another interview in 2013, she told the reporter that she bought the violin from Stern, not received it.

Chang uses a variety of bows: she has said that she prefers a Pajeot for Mozart and Bach; a Sartory for the Tchaikovsky and Sibelius concerti; and two Dominique Peccattes for other music.

Public image
Chang has performed with the New York Philharmonic, the Philadelphia Orchestra, the Chicago Symphony, the Boston Symphony, the Cleveland Orchestra, the Montréal Symphony Orchestra, the Berlin Philharmonic, the Vienna Philharmonic, orchestras in London, England, and the Royal Concertgebouw Orchestra of Amsterdam, the Netherlands. Additionally, she has performed with the Los Angeles Philharmonic, the NHK Symphony Orchestra of Tokyo, the Hong Kong Philharmonic Orchestra, the Bayerische Rundfunk Orchestra, the Washington National Symphony Orchestra, the Oslo Philharmonic, the Pittsburgh Symphony Orchestra, the Melbourne Symphony, Orchestre de la Suisse Romande, Orchestre Philharmonique de Luxembourg, the San Francisco Symphony Orchestra, the Orchestre National de France, the Honolulu Symphony, the St. Olaf Orchestra, and the Netherlands Radio Philharmonic Orchestra amongst others.

Chang has also been a soloist under the baton of conductors Mariss Jansons, Daniel Barenboim, Sir Colin Davis, Charles Dutoit, Bernard Haitink, James Levine, Lorin Maazel, Kurt Masur, Zubin Mehta, Riccardo Muti, André Previn, Sir Simon Rattle, Wolfgang Sawallisch, Leonard Slatkin, Michael Tilson Thomas, Plácido Domingo, David Lockington,  David Zinman, Gustavo Dudamel, Valery Gergiev, Esa-Pekka Salonen, Jaap van Zweden, John Williams, Steven Amundson, and others.

Notable recital engagements have included her Carnegie Hall debut and performances at the Kennedy Center, Orchestra Hall, Symphony Hall, Barbican Centre, Philharmonie, and Concertgebouw.

As a chamber musician, Chang has collaborated with Pinchas Zukerman, Wolfgang Sawallisch, Vladimir Ashkenazy, Yefim Bronfman, Martha Argerich, Leif Ove Andsnes, Stephen Kovacevich, Yo-Yo Ma, Lynn Harrell, Lars Vogt, and the late Isaac Stern. She has made several chamber recordings with current and former members of the Berlin Philharmonic, including the Sextet and Piano Quintet of Dvořák and the Souvenir de Florence of Tchaikovsky.

In January 2011, Sarah Chang was interviewed by Evan Solomon of Power & Politics (CBC) where it was revealed that she had been appointed by President Obama to the Presidential Commission on Russian Relations, and also was taking on a new role as State Department Special Cultural Envoy. Chang has already been promoting and supporting childhood musical education for many years. She has also been a cultural ambassador for the U.S.; for instance, she was invited to play in North Korea's capital, Pyongyang, with a South Korean orchestra in 2002.

Awards
Chang has received a number of awards, including:
 1992: Avery Fisher Career Grant
 1993: Gramophone Magazine Young Artist of the Year (1993)
 1993: Newcomer of the Year for "Echo" (Germany)
 1993: Nan Pa (South Korea)
 1994: Newcomer of the Year at the International Classical Music Awards
 1999: Avery Fisher Prize
 2004: Hollywood Bowl's Hall of Fame
 2005: Premio Internazionale Accademia Musicale Chigiana in Siena, Italy

Discography

CDs
 1992: Debut includes Pablo de Sarasate, Edward Elgar, Nicolo Paganini (EMI Classics)
 1992: Concert for Planet Earth, Live Recording/Placido Domingo/Sarah Chang/Wynton Marsalis (Sony Music)
 1993: Pyotr Ilyich Tchaikovsky: Violin Concerto Op 35. Conductor: Sir Colin Davis / Johannes Brahms: Hungarian Dances 1, 2, 4, 7 (EMI Classics)
 1994: Nicolo Paganini: Concerto No. 1 in D for Violin and Orchestra, Op. 6 / Camille Saint-Saëns: Havanaise for Violin and Orchestra, Op.83, Introduction and Rondo Capriccioso for Violin and Orchestra, Op.28. Orchestra: The Philadelphia Orchestra. Conductor: Wolfgang Sawallisch (EMI Classics)
 1995: Ralph Vaughan Williams: The Lark Ascending. Conductor: Bernard Haitink (EMI Classics)
 1996: Édouard Lalo: Symphonie Espagnole/Henri Vieuxtemps: Violin Concerto No. 5. Orchestra: Concertgebouw Orchestra (Lalo) / Philharmonia Orchestra (Vieuxtemps),  Conductor: Charles Dutoit (EMI Classics)
 1997: Simply Sarah/ Show Pieces/ Piano: Charles Abramovic (EMI Classics)
 1998: Felix Mendelssohn, Jean Sibelius: Violin Concertos. Orchestra: Berliner Philharmoniker, Conductor: Mariss Jansons (EMI Classics)
 1999: Sweet Sorrow/ Compilation Album includes Chaconne by Tomaso Antonio Vitali (EMI Classics)
 1999: Richard Strauss: Violin Concerto and Violin Sonata. Symphonieorchester des Bayerischen Rundfunks, Conductor and Piano: Wolfgang Sawallisch (EMI Classics)
 2000: Karl Goldmark: Violin Concerto op. 28. Orchestra: Gürzenich-Orchester, Conductor: James Conlon (EMI Classics)
 2002: Fire & Ice.   Pablo de Sarasate, Massenet, Maurice Ravel, Ludwig van Beethoven, Johann Sebastian Bach, Orchestra: Berliner Philharmoniker, Conductor: Plácido Domingo (EMI Classics)
 2002: Antonín Dvořák, Pyotr Ilyich Tchaikovsky: Sextets (with Berlin Philharmonic Members) (EMI Classics)
 2003: Antonín Dvořák: Violin Concerto Op. 53, Piano Quintet (with Leif Ove Andsnes), London Symphony Orchestra, Sir Colin Davis (EMI Classics)
 2004: French Violin Sonatas includes. César Franck, Camille Saint-Saëns, Maurice Ravel   Piano: Lars Vogt (EMI Classics)
 2005: Andrew Lloyd Webber: Phantasia (with cellist Julian Lloyd Webber) (EMI Classics)
 2006: Dmitri Shostakovich: Violin Concerto No.1 / Sergei Prokofiev: Violin Concert No.1. Orchestra: Berliner Philharmoniker, Conductor: Sir Simon Rattle (EMI Classics)
 2007: Antonio Vivaldi: The Four Seasons (Vivaldi), and Violin Concerto in g, op.12 no.1, RV.317. Orchestra: Orpheus Chamber Orchestra (EMI Classics)
 2009: Max Bruch Violin Concerto No.1, Johannes Brahms Violin Concerto Kurt Masur, Dresdner Philharmonie (EMI Classics)

DVDs
 1995: Niccolò Paganini Violin Concerto Berliner Philharmoniker, Zubin Mehta
 2003: Spanish Night: Sarasate Carmen Fantasie, Zigeunerweisen, Thais Meditation, Berliner Philharmoniker, Plácido Domingo (Conductor)

Footnotes

References

External links

 
 EMI Classics biography page
 Sarah Chang with Opus 3 Management
 Sarah Chang with IMG
 
 Sarah Chang Vivaldi: The Four Seasons
 Sarah Chang Bruch/Brahms Concertos
 

American classical violinists
American classical musicians of Korean descent
Aspen Music Festival and School alumni
Child classical musicians
Juilliard School alumni
Musicians from New Jersey
Musicians from Philadelphia
People from Cherry Hill, New Jersey
People from Voorhees Township, New Jersey
1980 births
Living people
Women classical violinists
21st-century American women musicians
21st-century classical violinists
21st-century American violinists